Pekka Peltola (born April 24, 1965) is a Finnish former ice hockey left winger. He played in the SM-liiga for HPK, Lukko, HIFK and Ässät.

In the 1988–89 season, Peltola won the Jarmo Wasama Memorial Trophy as the SM-liiga's Rookie of the Year after scoring 58 points including 28 goals in just 43 games. He was then drafted 130th overall by the Winnipeg Jets in the 1989 NHL Entry Draft, though he never played in North America and remained with HPK.

Peltola also played in the French Élite Ligue for Brest Albatros Hockey, the Austrian Hockey League for EC KAC and the German Deutsche Eishockey Liga for the Kassel Huskies.

Career statistics

References

External links

1965 births
Living people
Ässät players
Brest Albatros Hockey players
Finnish ice hockey left wingers
HIFK (ice hockey) players
HPK players
EC KAC players
Kassel Huskies players
Lukko players
Ice hockey people from Helsinki
Winnipeg Jets (1979–1996) draft picks